David Lam Tzit-yuen is a Hong Kong surgeon and politician who is the elected Legislative Council member for Medical and Health Services.

Biography 
In September 2022, Lam was removed of his status of being an international Fellow of the American College of Surgeons due to Lam being a national of China, saying "The American College of Surgeons regrets to inform you that it is not able to continue offering Fellowship or other membership status to residents of the People's Republic of China. Unfortunately, your status as an international Fellow falls into this situation. We are being advised to take this step to avoid issues with the PRC laws governing the operation of foreign organizations in the PRC." Lam said that his membership status had no actual use, and that he would save approximately US$200 per year on membership fees. Lam also criticized the organization, saying "It is utmost hypocrisy to sugarcoat sanctions as complying with the laws. It's time to draw a clear boundary." Later, his membership eligibility was reinstated.

On 27 December 2022, Lam said that Hong Kong should still isolate people with COVID-19 and should still impose PCR tests on inbound arrivals, saying "If we do not test them at the border, that means no test, which is a bit hazardous." However, Lam said that those coming from mainland China should be exempt from the PCR test at the border. On 28 December 2022, against Lam's opinion, the government announced that PCR tests for inbound arrivals would no longer be required.

Electoral history

References 

Living people
Year of birth missing (living people)
HK LegCo Members 2022–2025
Hong Kong pro-Beijing politicians